Hello It's Me is the second album by Lani Hall.

Track listing
"Hello It's Me" (Todd Rundgren) 3:35
"Peace in the Valley" (Carole King, Toni Stern) 4:10
"Time Will Tell" (Richard Mattley Jr., David Shire) 4:16
"Banquet" (Joni Mitchell) 2:48
"Wheelers and Dealers" (Dave Frishberg) 2:35
"Happy Woman Happy Man" (Peter Cetera) 2:35
"Exclusively For Me" (Colin Blunstone, David Jones) 3:40
"Save the Sunlight" (Buddy Buie, J. R. Cobb, Lani Lee) 3:14
"Sweet Jams and Jellies" (Lani Hall) 3:31
"Corrida de Jangada" (Edu Lobo, José Carlos Capinam) 1:54

Album credits

Performance credits 
Lani Hall - vocals on all, piano on 9
Larry Carlton - guitar on 1,2,4,7,10
Wilton Felder - bass on 1
Clarence McDonald - keyboards on 1,2,6,9
Mark Stevens - drums on 1
Jim Hughart - bass on 2,4,7
Mike Melvoin - piano on 2,4
Jim Gordon - drums on 2,4
Pete Jolly - accordion on 2
John Pisano - guitar on 3,5,6,8,10
Ernie McDaniels - bass on 3
Herb Alpert - voice on 2,4, piano on 3, anvil on 4
Julius Wechter - bells on 3, vibes on 5, marimba on 8
Vince Charles - percussion on 3,5,6,8,10
Nick Ceroli - drums on 3
Dave Frishberg - keyboards on 3,5,8,10
Bob Edmondson - trombone on 3,8
Bob Findley - trumpet on 3,8
Mike Melvoin - piano on 4,5
Papito Hernandez - bass on 5,6,8,10
Steve Schaeffer - drums on 5,6,8,10
Michel Colombier - keyboards on 7
Emil Richards - cymbalom on 7

1975 albums
Lani Hall albums
Albums produced by Herb Alpert
A&M Records albums